Mambo is an Italian/American international co-production film, produced by Dino De Laurentiis, Carlo Ponti and Paramount Pictures written and directed from 1952 to 1953 by Robert Rossen and released in 1955. A mambo craze spread through the USA in the 1950s, and Rossen aimed to repair his finances after almost two years without work since his 1951 House Un-American Activities Committee hearing. The film co-stars Katherine Dunham who acted as the film's choreographer.

Plot 
The film stars Silvana Mangano as Giovanna Masetti, a poor Venetian who is admired by the crafty croupier Mario Rossi (Vittorio Gassman) and the rich count Enrico Marisoni (Michael Rennie). Discovered by Toni Salerno (Shelley Winters), Giovanna lives out a dream to become a dancer and moves to Rome.  She returns six months later to the competing affections of Mario and Enrico, resulting in a choice between the two and the dramatic finale.

Cast

Critical reception
Rossen later said, "Mambo was to be for fun only," but he "took it seriously, and it didn't come off." The New York Times found the plot contorted, the script long and incredible, and lead actress Silvana Mangano's performance laborious, but praised Rossen's skilfully created moods, some decadent and others melancholy. Alan Casty dismissed the film as a "mere job".

However, in 2001 Dorothea Fischer-Hornung concluded that the film achieved more than Rossen and contemporary critics realised. The lead, Italian shop-girl Giovanna, enrolls in a troupe led by real-time choreographer Katherine Dunham. The other three main characters in different ways try to dominate Giovanna, but she renounces one while the other two die violently. Giovanna returns to the troupe to devote herself to dance. In the first scene a sexually charged dance accompanies a character's intense pass at Giovanna. The rest of the first third of the film forms three stages of Giovanna's training: basic lessons in Durham's technique; Giovanna collapses; more advance training, using twirling and other movements to induce trances. While most contemporary critics considered the cinematography of the dance scenes "confusing" and "handled with no real flair", one described it as "briefly, seems like genius", replacing conventional straight shots with sudden cuts, mirroring and montage.

Notes

References

See also
List of American films of 1955

External links

Films directed by Robert Rossen
1954 films
Italian drama films
American drama films
Films scored by Nino Rota
1954 drama films
1950s English-language films
English-language Italian films
American black-and-white films
Films produced by Carlo Ponti
Films produced by Dino De Laurentiis
Paramount Pictures films
Films scored by Angelo Francesco Lavagnino
Films shot in Venice
1950s American films
1950s Italian films